Harttia is a genus of armored catfishes native to South America.

The genus name comes from Charles Frederick Hartt (1840-1878), a geologist, paleontologist and naturalist, who collected the many specimens during the Thayer Expedition to Brazil in the years 1865-1866.

Taxonomy
As of 1997, Harttia was considered a monophyletic taxon. However, Harttia is in need of revision. For example, the synonymy of Cteniloricaria with Harttia was questionable because it rested solely on the characteristics of Harttia fowleri without considering the type species of Cteniloricaria.

Species 
There are currently 25 recognized species in this genus:
 Harttia absaberi Oyakawa, Fichberg & Langeani, 2013
 Harttia canastra Caldas, Cherobim & Langeani, 2022 
 Harttia carvalhoi P. Miranda-Ribeiro, 1939
 Harttia depressa Rapp Py-Daniel & E. C. de Oliveira, 2001
 Harttia dissidens Rapp Py-Daniel & E. C. de Oliveira, 2001
 Harttia duriventris Rapp Py-Daniel & E. C. de Oliveira, 2001
 Harttia fluminensis Covain & Fisch-Muller, 2012
 Harttia fowleri (Pellegrin, 1908)
 Harttia garavelloi Oyakawa, 1993
 Harttia gracilis Oyakawa, 1993
 Harttia guianensis Rapp Py-Daniel & E. C. de Oliveira, 2001
 Harttia intermontana Oliveira & Oyakawa, 2019
 Harttia kronei A. Miranda-Ribeiro, 1908
 Harttia leiopleura Oyakawa, 1993
 Harttia longipinna Langeani, Oyakawa & Montoya-Burgos, 2001
 Harttia loricariformis Steindachner, 1877
 Harttia merevari Provenzano, Machado-Allison, Chernoff, Willink & Petry, 2005
 Harttia novalimensis Oyakawa, 1993
 Harttia punctata Rapp Py-Daniel & E. C. de Oliveira, 2001
 Harttia rhombocephala P. Miranda-Ribeiro, 1939
 Harttia surinamensis Boeseman, 1971
 Harttia torrenticola Oyakawa, 1993
 Harttia trombetensis Rapp Py-Daniel & E. C. de Oliveira, 2001
 Harttia tuna Covain & Fisch-Muller, 2012
 Harttia uatumensis Rapp Py-Daniel & E. C. de Oliveira, 2001

Distribution and habitat
Distribution of Harttia species primarily includes rivers draining the Guyana Shield, coastal rivers in northeastern Brazil, and the Amazon River basin. The greatest species diversity of Harttia, occurs in the Pre-Cambrian Brazilian Shield region. Only H. platystoma and H. merevari are known from Venezuela. These rheophilic fishes are found in the upper courses of rivers over rocky and sandy bottoms. Harttia species are thought to be able to exploit areas with the strongest current, because of its extremely depressed body and long caudal peduncle, comparing to other species.

Description
Sexual dimorphism includes hypertrophied odontodes on the pectoral fin spines and along the margins of the snout in mature males.

Harttia exhibits considerable karyotypic diversity with chromosome numbers between 2n = 52 and 2n = 58 in the four species characterized.

Ecology
Representatives of this genus seem to be open brooders.

References

External links
 

 
Fish of the Amazon basin
Catfish genera
Taxa named by Franz Steindachner
Freshwater fish genera